Lake Geneva is an unincorporated community located in Clay County, Florida, United States. The community is located along Florida State Road 100 southeast of Keystone Heights, Florida. It is named after Lake Geneva, which is the lake the settlement is right next to (not to be confused with the glacial lake of Lake Geneva  on the northern front of the French Alps).

Notes

Unincorporated communities in Clay County, Florida
Unincorporated communities in Florida
Unincorporated communities in the Jacksonville metropolitan area